Alburnus volviticus is a species of ray-finned fish in the genus Alburnus, that is endemic to Greece where it occurred in Lake Volvi and Lake Koronia, although it has now been extirpated from the latter.

References

volviticus
Endemic fauna of Greece
Fish described in 2007
Taxa named by Jörg Freyhof